Samuel Charles Abel (30 December 1908 – 26 September 1959) was an English footballer who played in the Football League for Accrington Stanley, Chesterfield, Fulham and Queens Park Rangers, signing for QPR on 24 May 1934 after 2 seasons with Fulham. He was signed by QPR to play as a forward but later played right back. Signed for Tunbridge Wells Rangers for 1938–39 season During the war he was a Special Constable in the Harlesden area of London and played again for QPR during the war time league. After the war he became a groundsman at Wembley Stadium.

References

1908 births
1959 deaths
English footballers
Bury F.C. players
Accrington Stanley F.C. (1891) players
Chesterfield F.C. players
Fulham F.C. players
Queens Park Rangers F.C. players
English Football League players
People from Neston
Tunbridge Wells F.C. players
Metropolitan Special Constabulary officers
Footballers from Cheshire
Association football forwards